The 2015–16 Montana State Bobcats women's basketball team represented Montana State University during the 2015–16 NCAA Division I women's basketball season. The Bobcats, led by tenth year head coach Tricia Binford, played their home games at Worthington Arena and were members of the Big Sky Conference. They finished the season 21–10, 14–4 in Big Sky play to win the Big Sky regular season championship. They lost in the quarterfinals of the Big Sky women's tournament where they lost to Idaho State. As champs of the Big Sky Conference who failed to win their conference tournament, they received an automatic bid to the Women's National Invitation Tournament where they lost to Utah in the first round.

John Stockton, the NBA's all-time leader in assists and steals, and a member of the Naismith Memorial Basketball Hall of Fame, joined as an assistant coach to replace Kellee Barney. Barney left the program to pursue a career in business, and Stockton had previously coached four of the players on the MSU women's team during Amateur Athletic Union leagues.

Roster

Schedule

|-
!colspan=9 style="background:#0a1f62; color:#c1b465;"| Exhibition

|-
!colspan=9 style="background:#0a1f62; color:#c1b465;"| Non-conference regular season

|-
!colspan=9 style="background:#0a1f62; color:#c1b465;"| Big Sky regular season

|-
!colspan=9 style="background:#0a1f62; color:#c1b465;"| Big Sky Women's Tournament

|-
!colspan=9 style="background:#0a1f62; color:#c1b465;"| WNIT

See also
2015–16 Montana State Bobcats men's basketball team

References

Montana State Bobcats women's basketball seasons
Montana State
2016 Women's National Invitation Tournament participants